Frédérique Martin (born 28 January 1969) is a French former professional tennis player.

While competing on the professional tour in the late 1980s, Martin reached career high rankings of 322 in singles and 107 in doubles. She featured in the women's doubles and mixed doubles main draws of the 1987 French Open. Her best performance on the WTA Tour was a semi-final appearance in doubles at the 1988 Athens Trophy.

Martin now works as a naturopath.

ITF finals

Doubles: 3 (2–1)

References

External links
 
 

1969 births
Living people
French female tennis players